"Author! Author!" is a fantasy short story  by American writer and scientist Isaac Asimov.

Background
By January 1943 Isaac Asimov was working at the Philadelphia Navy Yard and had not written any fiction for almost a year. Still hoping to be published in Unknown after five rejections, he began writing "Author! Author!" and in April finished it and sold it to editor John W. Campbell for $150. The magazine closed because of a wartime paper shortage before the story was published, but it was included 21 years later in an anthology of stories from the magazine, The Unknown Five, and  the 1972 collection The Early Asimov.

Plot
Graham Dorn, a successful mystery writer, finds to his dismay that his most famous literary creation, a suave detective named Reginald de Meister, has become real. He usurps Dorn's life and even attempts to steal his fiancee. Graham counters by rewriting his current manuscript so that De Meister is married to the flashing-eyed, svelte, jealous Sancha Rodriguez, who promptly appears and accuses De Meister of two-timing her. The two characters disappear back into the world of fiction and Graham's life becomes his own again.

References

External links 
 

Short stories by Isaac Asimov
1964 short stories
Fantasy short stories